Ceridian HCM is an American provider of human resources software and services with employees in the USA, Canada, Europe, Australia and Mauritius. It is a publicly traded company on the New York Stock Exchange.

History 

Ceridian is a descendant of Control Data Corporation (CDC). In 1992, Ceridian was founded as an information services company from the restructuring of CDC, a computer services and manufacturing company founded in 1957.

In 2007, Ceridian was acquired for US$5.3 billion by Thomas H. Lee Partners and Fidelity National Financial (FNF). Ceridian common stock ceased trading on the NYSE before commencement of trading on November 9, 2007 and was delisted from the NYSE.

In March 2012, Ceridian completed its acquisition of Dayforce, a single SaaS application for HR, payroll, tax, benefits, workforce management, talent management and several related activities. In October 2013, Ceridian announced the legal separation of its Human Capital Management and payments businesses. Ceridian completed the separation on October 1, 2013 through a series of transactions, which resulted in the payments business being operated as Comdata Inc. (“Comdata”), and the HCM business being operated as Ceridian HCM Holding Inc. (“Ceridian HCM”).

David Ossip, Chief Executive Officer of Dayforce, became CEO of Ceridian HCM in February 2013.

In April 2018, Ceridian went public in an initial offering that raised over $400 million.

In September 2019, Ceridian acquired Australia-based enterprise workforce management solutions provider Riteq.

In April 2020, Ceridian acquired an Asian HCM (Excelity Global Solutions).

On 1 March 2021, Ceridian completed the acquisition of Ascender HCM.

Leadership 

 David Ossip, Chairman and Chief Executive Officer (2013–present)
 Leagh Turner, President and Chief Operating Officer (2018–present)

References

Further reading
 HR Pioneers: A History of Human Resource Innovations at Control Data Corporation - Mark Jensen 
 The Integration of Employee Assistance, Work/Life, and Wellness Services
 Achieving HR Excellence through Six Sigma - Daniel Bloom
 Employee Assistance Programs: Wellness/Enhancement Programming (4th Ed.)

External links
 

 
1982 establishments in Minnesota
Fidelity National Financial
American companies established in 1992
Consulting firms established in 1992
Software companies established in 1992
Companies based in Bloomington, Minnesota
Software companies based in Minnesota
International management consulting firms
International information technology consulting firms
Human resource management software
ERP software companies
Companies listed on the New York Stock Exchange
2007 mergers and acquisitions
2018 initial public offerings
Software companies of the United States